is a kind of shōchū made with perilla leaves cultivated in Shiranuka. It is produced in Asahikawa, Hokkaidō, Japan. The alcohol content is twenty percent.

References and notes
Tantakatan Tantakatan - shochucircle.com

External links
Official website

Japanese distilled drinks